Ilhas (Portuguese for "Islands") is the fourth studio album by Brazilian psychedelic rock band Violeta de Outono, released on May 9, 2005 by Voiceprint Records. It was the last album of the band to feature the original line-up of Fabio Golfetti, Cláudio Souza and Angelo Pastorello.

The track "Dança" previously appeared in Em Toda Parte, and was re-recorded for this release.

João Parahyba of Trio Mocotó fame provided additional percussion instruments for some of the tracks.

Track listing

Personnel
 Fabio Golfetti – vocals, guitar, production
 Cláudio Souza – drums
 Angelo Pastorello – bass, cover art, production
 Gregor Izidro – additional percussion
 João Parahyba – additional percussion
 Fábio Ribeiro – keyboards
 Naide Patapas – backing vocals

References

External links
 Ilhas at Violeta de Outono's official Bandcamp

2005 albums
Voiceprint Records albums
Violeta de Outono albums
Portuguese-language albums